Traveller is an album by Christy Moore, released in 1999.

Track listing
"Urgency Culture"
"Raggle Taggle Gypsy"
"I Loved Her"
"Tell It unto Me"
"Rocky Road to Dublin"
"Last Cold Kiss"
"Lovely Young One"
"The Siren's Voice"
"Burning Times"
"Glastonbury"
"The Well"
"What's the Story, Git"

Personnel
Christy Moore – vocal, guitar, bodhran
Leo Pearson – keyboards, guitar, percussion, programming
Dónal Lunny – bouzouki 
Liam O'Flynn – Uilleann pipes 
The Edge – guitar
Juno Moore – vocals 
Andy Moore – vocals 
Dom Muldoon – guitars
Conor Byrne – flutes, whistle 
Wally Page – guitar

2000 albums
Christy Moore albums